Vergette is a surname. Notable people with the surname include:

Marcus Vergette (born 1961), American-born UK-based sculptor 
Nicholas Vergette (1923–1974), British potter and sculptor
 Richard Vergette, British playwright, actor, and drama teacher

See also
Vermette